Elections to Barnsley Metropolitan Borough Council were held on 8 May 1986, with one third of the council up for election as well as vacancies in Athersley and South West wards. Prior to the election Labour gained a seat from Alliance in a Penistone East by-election. The election resulted in Labour retaining control of the council.

Election result

This resulted in the following composition of the council:

Ward results

+/- figures represent changes from the last time these wards were contested.

By-elections between 1986 and 1987

References

1986 English local elections
1986
1980s in South Yorkshire